Hannah Levy (born 1991) is an American sculptor known for the inventive use of silicone as well as stainless steel in her works.

Levy obtained her BFA in 2013 from Cornell University in  Ithaca, New York and was a Meisterschüler (Master's student) at  the Städelschule in Frankfurt am Main, Germany.

Her work was the subject of the solo exhibition Surplus Tension at the Arts Club of Chicago. Her piece "Retainer" was commissioned for the High Line in New York City in 2019, completed in 2020, and exhibited 2021–2022. Levy's work is included in the 2022 Venice Biennale.

Levy is represented by the Casey Kaplan gallery in New York City. Levy lives and works in New York City.

References

American sculptors
American women sculptors
Cornell University alumni
1991 births
Living people